Gammertingen is a town in the district of Sigmaringen, in Baden-Württemberg, Germany. It is situated 18 km north of Sigmaringen.

Geography

Geographical location
Gammertingen is located on the Swabian Jura in the valley of the Lauchert, a tributary of the Danube.

Neighbouring communities
The following cities and towns are adjacent to the city of Gammertingen. They are called the clockwise, starting in the Northeast:

Pfronstetten (Reutlingen (district)) Langenenslingen (Biberach (district)) Hettingen, Neufra, Burladingen (Zollernalbkreis), Trochtelfingen (Reutlingen (district)).

Constituent communities
In addition to the core city of Gammertingen with around 5000 inhabitants belong to the whole city five districts, among them the three boroughs Feldhausen, Harthausen and Kettenacker together with the princely Hohenzollern domain Lusthof on the plateau of the Swabian Jura, Bronnen and Mariaberg.

History
The well-known Helmet of Gammertingen and other rich grave goods from a number of burial grounds provide the information of an early settlement in the time of the Merovingian dynasty.
Gammertingen was first mentioned  in 1101 in a document of the Kloster Allerheiligen, Schaffhausen. 
Gammertingen was first mentioned in 1311 as a city.  During the time of the Hohenzollern and later Prussian times, Gammertingen was the seat of Oberamt, district court, forestry department and land registry.

During the Nazi era, a Reichsarbeitsdienst camp for females was located in Gammertingen.

Notable people

John O. Henes (1852–1923), American businessman and philanthropist

References 

Sigmaringen (district)